Pavel Šnobel (born 28 February 1980) is a left-handed, Czech former tennis player. He reached his career-high rankings of world No. 154 in singles February 2009 and No. 110 in doubles in February 2006.

Juniors career
Šnobel was year-end No. 131 in 1997 in the junior world rankings.

Professional career

In 2008, Šnobel won Croatia F2 in February and reached a Challenger semifinal in March in Sarajevo, and a Challenger quarterfinal in Korea in April. But his ranking slipped back down below 300 by April. In Uzbekistan in May, he won the Challenger in Fergana a week after being runner-up in Uzbekistan F2, to improve his ranking back to No. 219.

In June, Šnobel qualified in singles for the 2008 Wimbledon Championships, beating No. 159 Dušan Vemić, No. 474 Antony Dupuis, and No. 130 Flavio Cipolla.

External links
  Official website
 
 
 Snobel World ranking history

1980 births
Czech male tennis players
Universiade medalists in tennis
People from Havířov
Living people
Universiade gold medalists for the Czech Republic
Medalists at the 2007 Summer Universiade
Sportspeople from the Moravian-Silesian Region